James Harris Fairchild (1817–1902) was an American educator, author, and  third president of Oberlin College.

Biography 
Fairchild was born in Stockbridge, Massachusetts, on November 25, 1817. His father was Grandison Fairchild. Two of his brothers were Henry Fairchild and George Fairchild, both of whom became college presidents. Soon after his birth his parents moved to Brownhelm, Lorain County, Ohio, and settled on a farm about ten miles from the present site of Oberlin College.

When Oberlin opened its doors in 1834, Fairchild entered as a freshman.  He graduated in 1838. The year after graduation he was appointed tutor in the college, was ordained in 1841, and in 1842 became professor of Latin and Greek. In 1847, he was transferred to the chair of mathematics, and in 1858 to that of theology and moral philosophy.

A committed abolitionist, Fairchild played a role in the famous Oberlin-Wellington Rescue. In September 1858, he hid fugitive slave John Price in his home. A short time later, rescuers took Price to freedom in Canada.

In 1866, Fairchild became the third president of Oberlin College. During his tenure, the faculty and physical plant of the college expanded dramatically. In 1889, he resigned as president but remained as chair of systematic theology. In 1896, Fairchild returned to the Oberlin leadership as acting President, serving until 1898.

Fairchild's wife, Mary Fletcher Kellogg, was one of the first group of four women to be admitted to a college in the United States. She was the only one who didn't graduate, as her father's business failed. Her family moved to a frontier area of Louisiana, and Fairchild, who'd known her while they were students at Oberlin, came down and married her in November 1841.

Fairchild wrote a history of Oberlin, which was published in 1883. He also wrote works on philosophy.

A biography of Fairchild, James Harris Fairchild: or Sixty-Eight Years with a Christian College, was written by Albert Temple Swing and published in 1907.

Bibliography 
 The Coeducation of the Sexes, 1867
 Oberlin: The colony and the College, 1833-1883, 1883
 Moral science; or, The philosophy of obligation, revised edition, 1892. First published in 1869 as Moral philosophy; or, The science of obligation.
 Elements of theology, natural and revealed

References

Notes

Sources consulted 
 National Cyclopaedia biography (public domain')
Fairchild entry, World Cat

Further reading 
 "Fairchild, James Harris." American National Biography (1999). 7:682-683.
 "Fairchild, James Harris." The National Cyclopaedia of American Biography (1895). 2:464-465.

External links 

1817 births
1902 deaths
Oberlin College alumni
Oberlin College faculty
James
People from Stockbridge, Massachusetts
People from Oberlin, Ohio
Presidents of Oberlin College
American abolitionists